"Ben" is a song written by Don Black and Walter Scharf for the 1972 film of the same name (a spin-off to the 1971 killer rat film Willard). It was performed by Lee Montgomery in the film and by Michael Jackson over the closing credits. Jackson's single, recorded for the Motown label in 1972, spent one week at the top of the Billboard Hot 100, making it Jackson's first number one single in the US as a solo artist. Billboard ranked it as the number 20 song for 1972. It also reached number 1 on the ARIA Charts, spending eight weeks at the top spot. The song also later reached a peak of number 7 on the UK Singles Chart. In 2004, the song appeared in The Ultimate Collection.

"Ben" won a Golden Globe for Best Song. It was nominated for an Academy Award for Best Original Song in 1973, losing to "The Morning After" by Maureen McGovern from The Poseidon Adventure. Jackson lip-synced to the song at the Oscars ceremony, possibly as his vocal range had shifted since its recording.

Background
"Ben" was originally written for Donny Osmond, but he was on tour at the time and unavailable for recording, so Black and Scharf offered the song to Jackson instead. In addition to its one week at number 1 in the U.S., the song also later reached a peak of number 7 on the British pop chart. "Ben" won a Golden Globe for Best Song. It was also nominated for an Academy Award for Best Original Song in 1973; Jackson performed the song in front of a live audience at the ceremony. Billboard called it a "beauty".

Although Jackson had already become the youngest artist to ever record a number 1 ("I Want You Back" with The Jackson 5, in 1970), "Ben" made him the third-youngest solo artist, at 14, to score a number 1 hit single. Only Stevie Wonder, who was 13 when "Fingertips" went to number 1, and Osmond, who was months shy of his 14th birthday when "Go Away Little Girl" hit number 1 in 1971, were younger. The song is one of Jackson's most re-released, having appeared on The Jackson 5 Anthology, The Best of Michael Jackson, 18 Greatest Hits, Michael Jackson Anthology, Jackson 5: The Ultimate Collection, The Essential Michael Jackson, Michael Jackson: The Ultimate Collection, Hello World: The Motown Solo Collection, The Definitive Collection, The Jacksons Story, the North American version of Number Ones (even though here it is the 1981 live version), some versions of King of Pop and Icon.

A live recorded version was released on the 1981 album The Jacksons Live! and remixed versions have appeared on The Remix Suite, The Stripped Mixes and some versions of Immortal. After Jackson's death, singer Akon released a remix of the song with his own background vocals and Jackson's original vocal solo.

Charts

Weekly charts

Year-end charts

Critical reception
AllMusic editor Lindsay Planer wrote about the success of the song: "Like much of the Motown empire at the time, the title track's multimedia exposure, coupled with strong crossover appeal, ensured that "Ben" scored the artist his first Pop Singles' chart-topper" and he highlighted the track. Rolling Stone editor Vince Aletti was not satisfied: "The title song is lovely, no doubt, and Michael packs it with a surprising amount of feeling (his delivery of "They don't see you as I do/I wish they would try to" still tears me up) but it's all a little too thick for my tastes".

Sales

Marti Webb version 

In 1985, the song became a top 10 hit again in the U.K. when covered by Marti Webb as a tribute to Ben Hardwick, a young liver transplant patient.  This version reached #5 in the U.K. Singles Chart and was one of the singer's biggest hits. The song's lyricist, Don Black, was at the time Webb's manager.

See also
List of number-one singles in Australia during the 1970s
List of Billboard Hot 100 number ones of 1972

References

External links
 

Film theme songs
1972 singles
Michael Jackson songs
Best Original Song Golden Globe winning songs
Billboard Hot 100 number-one singles
Number-one singles in Australia
Songs with lyrics by Don Black (lyricist)
Pop ballads
Songs about mice and rats
Motown singles
1972 songs
Boyzone songs
1970s ballads
Soul ballads
Songs about friendship